The 1990–91 Vancouver Canucks season was the team's 21st in the National Hockey League (NHL).

Offseason
Entering his last season as a player, Stan Smyl resigns the team captaincy. The position is rotated between defenceman Doug Lidster, forwards Trevor Linden and Dan Quinn.

Regular season

Coaching change and USAir Flight 1493
The Canucks who were slumping in the first half of the regular season fired head coach Bob McCammon on January 31, 1991. He was fired immediately after a home game against the New York Rangers that ended in a 3–3 tie. The game was noted for a spectacular goal tending performance by Rangers goal tender Mike Richter who made 59 saves.

The next day McCammon was replaced by Pat Quinn who would fly down with the team to Los Angeles on board the Canadian Airlines charter to coach his first game for the club against the Los Angeles Kings. The pilot of the plane carrying the team even turned on the engines to move away from the accident, fearing that the plane would be involved in the accident.

Quinn and the team were badly shaken by the incident, the team was unable to cope with the disaster when they faced the Kings on February 2. The team suffered its worst defeat of the season 9–1. The crash was still bothering the team when they flew out of Los Angeles to another road game in Washington D.C. to face the Washington Capitals. The Canucks would be held winless for their seventh straight game as hall of famer Dino Ciccarelli netted his 400th career regular season NHL goal.

Final standings

Schedule and results

Playoffs

Smythe Division Semi-Finals: vs. (1) Los Angeles Kings
Los Angeles wins series 4-2

Player statistics

Note: GP = Games played; G = Goals; A = Assists; Pts = Points; +/- = Plus/Minus; PIM = Penalty Minutes

Awards and records

Transactions

Trades

Draft picks
Vancouver's picks at the 1990 NHL Entry Draft in Vancouver, British Columbia.

Farm teams
Milwaukee Admirals (IHL)

See also
1990–91 NHL season

References

External links

Vancouver Canucks seasons
Vancouver C
Vancouver